AIBOU: The Movie, also known as Partners: The Movie, is a 2008 Japanese film, directed by Seiji Izumi and based on the television series AIBOU: Tokyo Detective Duo. It was the first in the Aibou (Partners) film series, followed by AIBOU: CSI Files (2009), AIBOU: The Movie II (2010), AIBOU: X-DAY (2013), AIBOU: The Movie III (2014) and AIBOU: The Movie IV (2017).

Cast
 Yutaka Mizutani
 Yasufumi Terawaki
 Sawa Suzuki
 Saya Takagi
 Kazuhisa Kawahara
 Ryosuke Otani
 Takashi Yamanaka
 Atsushi Yamanishi
 Seiji Rokkaku as Mamoru Yonezawa
 Ryūji Katagiri
 Ryō Ono
 Satoshi Jinbo
 Ittoku Kishibe
 Yuika Motokariya
 Yoshino Kimura
 Akira Onodera
 Masahiko Nishimura
 Masahiko Tsugawa
 Toshiyuki Nishida

Reception
Yasufumi Terawaki was nominated for Best Supporting Actor at the 32nd Japan Academy Prize.

Footnotes

References

External links
  
 

2008 films
2000s Japanese-language films
2008 action thriller films
2000s buddy films
Films about terrorism
Films based on television series
Films directed by Seiji Izumi
Films set in Tokyo
Japanese action thriller films
Police detective films
Running films
Toei Company films
Tokyo Metropolitan Police Department in fiction
Films scored by Yoshihiro Ike
2000s Japanese films